USS Intrepid may refer to the following ships of the United States Navy:

, an armed ketch captured as a prize by the US Navy on 23 December 1803. Later used by Commodore Stephen Decatur on a mission to enter Tripoli harbor and destroy the captured . The vessel was later exploded in the harbor of Tripoli 4 September 1804.
, an experimental steam torpedo ram commissioned 31 July 1874 and sold 9 May 1892
, a training and receiving ship launched 8 October 1904 and sold 20 December 1921
, an aircraft carrier launched 26 April 1943 and decommissioned 15 March 1974. Intrepid opened as a museum in New York City during August 1982 and is designated as a National Historic Landmark.

See also 
 Intrepid was the name of the Lunar Module on Apollo 12

United States Navy ship names